Cottonville is an unincorporated community located in the town of Preston, Adams County, Wisconsin, United States. Originally named Roche-A-Cree, Cottonville was named after Julius Cotton, who built a dam and sawmill on Big Roche-a-Cri Creek in the 1850s.

References

Unincorporated communities in Adams County, Wisconsin
Unincorporated communities in Wisconsin